The Mystery of the Masked Rider is a novel in the Nancy Drew Mystery Stories series about the teenage girl-detective, published in 1992. While appearing under the Carolyn Keene house pseudonym, it was written by Alison Hart.

Plot summary
Cover legend: "Revenge rides a dark horse – and Nancy's the target!" 

Nancy Drew is going to visit one of her best friends, Colleen, who is horse crazy and has her own horses. With one of the best of them, Nightingale, she is going to race in the Midwest International Horse Show. The prize-winning filly is worth a cool $200,000 and that kind of cash can breed plenty of greed, ambition and danger. Soon Nancy has her hands full trying to stop the mysterious culprit, the Masked Rider, who wants to kill Nightingale.

References

Nancy Drew books
1992 American novels
1992 children's books
Horse racing novels
Children's novels about animals